Ustav may refer to:

 Typikon, liturgical book in Byzantine Rite churches
 , the uncial style of early Cyrillic writing, used from the 9th century to the 14th-15th centuries. This evolved into  (semi-uncial, a type still in use for the Church Slavonic publishing); it later split into skoropis′ (the shorthand predecessor of modern Cyrillic cursive) and modern types of printed Cyrillic script. Since the 19th century, ustav-style Cyrillic fonts are used in academic publishing to reproduce old Slavonic texts.
 Constitution in Serbo-Croatian and Macedonian